The Spanish Mastiff or Mastín Español is a breed of dog from Spain, originally bred to be a guard dog and whose specialized purpose is to be a livestock guardian dog protecting flocks and/or herds from wolves and other predators.

Historical context

In medieval times, this dog has accompanied the herds of sheep crossing from northern to southern Spain, defending cattle from attack by wolves and other predators. The mastiff had the protection of chunky metal necklaces with skewers. Its function was primarily protective, unlike its fellow Carea dogs, whose function is grazing, driving the herds in response to indications of the shepherd. In some places it is known as perro merinero when it accompanies sheep of the Merino breed.

The first breed standard of the Spanish Mastiff was made by the FCI in 1946. In 1981 the Asociación Española del Perro Mastín Español was formed, who organized a breeding program looking for the kind of large and strong mastiff of the past times, and drafted a new breed standard focused on recovering the old cattle dogs, fit as pets, and as guard dog and defense.

Appearance
The Spanish Mastiff is a very large and powerful dog, similar in appearance to the other mastiff breeds. They have a large powerful head and serious and vigilant expression.

Females are at least , and weigh .

It has small eyes and drop ears resembling triangles. This dog's coat is most often fawn, but it can also be brindle, black or 'wolf'-colored. Reddish tones indicate miscegenation.

Temperament

This noble giant is aloof, dignified, calm and intelligent. It is devoted to its family and may politely accept strangers if it has been socialized properly, although it will be wary of them. It can be aggressive toward other dogs. The Spanish Mastiff may be a less-than-ideal pet in urban situations, where its booming voice and massive size could be problematic. It is a wonderful protector of its home and family.

Socialization and training should begin early to ensure this dog a stable and reliable pet. Supervised exposure in puppyhood to a variety of unfamiliar but non-threatening dogs will help dampen a tendency to aggression toward other dogs. The breed is quite alert and food motivated but can bore easily; training must be consistent and firm but gentle. Once the trainer has established the dog's respect as leader, the Spanish Mastiff will be an extremely loyal pet.

Exercise
This dog is more inclined to lumber than gallop, but it can move quite rapidly when necessary. A long daily walk will be sufficient, although it will appreciate a fenced area where it can exercise at its own rate.

Varieties

In addition to its considered "official" variety, which is the current and modern Spanish Mastiff framed in a rigid aesthetic pattern and recognized by the largest canine entities, there is also its more primitive, traditional variety, considered unofficial, that does not meet any aesthetic standards and has as its objective, still today, to serve its owners acting in the protection of flocks against predators. These unofficial strains, for the purpose of differentiation, are termed the Traditional Spanish Mastiff, Working Spanish Mastiff, Leonese Mastiff, and Wolf Dog. These unofficial strains continue to act actively in their original and primitive function.

Representative dogs
 Las Meninas by Diego Velázquez features an impressive example of the breed.
 Actor Viggo Mortensen has, by a gift when he was in León, both a Carea Leonés and a Spanish Mastiff, named "Aragorn" and "Alatriste", the names of two characters that he played in his movies.

See also
 Dogs portal
 List of dog breeds

Notes

Dog breeds originating in Spain
FCI breeds
Livestock guardian dogs